August Christian Manthey (14 February 1811 – 25 May 1880) was a Norwegian Minister who held several government posts in the period 1856–1875. He served as Minister of Auditing, Justice, Finance, the Interior, the Navy and the Army, as well as being member of the Council of State Division in Stockholm in different periods.

References

1811 births
1880 deaths
Government ministers of Norway
County governors of Norway
19th-century Norwegian politicians
Ministers of Finance of Norway
Ministers of Justice of Norway
Defence ministers of Norway